Henry William Thompson (September 3, 1925 – November 6, 2007) was an American country music singer-songwriter and musician whose career spanned seven decades.

Thompson's musical style, characterized as honky-tonk Western swing, was a mixture of fiddles, electric guitar, and steel guitar that featured his distinctive, smooth baritone vocals.

His backing band, The Brazos Valley Boys, was voted the top Country Western Band for 14 years in a row by Billboard. Thompson pursued a "light" version of the Western swing sound that Bob Wills and others played; the primary difference between his music and that of Bob Wills was that Thompson, who used the swing beat and instrumentation to enhance his vocals, discouraged the intense instrumental soloing from his musicians that Wills encouraged; however, the "Hank Thompson sound" exceeded Bob Wills in top-40 country hits.

Although not as prominent on the top country charts in later decades, Thompson remained a recording artist and concert draw well into his 80s.

The 2013 game  Grand Theft Auto V featured his song "It Don't Hurt Anymore" in the fictional radio show, Rebel Radio.

The 1987 novel Crazy Heart by Thomas Cobb was inspired by Thompson's life, specifically by his practice of picking up a local band to back him when he toured. In 2009, Cobb's novel was turned into a successful film directed by Scott Cooper and starring Jeff Bridges in an Academy Award-winning performance.

Biography
Born in Waco, Texas, United States, Thompson was interested in music from an early age, and won several amateur harmonica contests. He decided to pursue his musical talent after serving in the United States Navy in World War II as a radioman and studying electrical engineering at Princeton University before his discharge.  He had intended to continue those studies on the GI Bill following his 1946 discharge, and return to Waco. Later that year, after having regional hits with his first single "Whoa Sailor" for Globe Records, Dallas (Globe 124) and almost simultaneously "California Women" for another Dallas label (Blue Bonnet 123), he chose to pursue a full-time musical career.

1952 brought his first number-one single, "The Wild Side of Life", which contained the memorable line, "I didn't know God made honky-tonk angels". (This line inspired songwriter J. D. "Jay" Miller to write the 1952 answer song "It Wasn't God Who Made Honky Tonk Angels", which became the first hit single for pioneer female country vocalist Kitty Wells.) Other hits for Thompson followed in quick succession in the 1950s and 1960s.

Thompson began singing in a plaintive honky-tonk style similar to that of Ernest Tubb, but, desiring to secure more engagements in the dance halls of the Southwest, he reconfigured his band, the Brazos Valley Boys, to play a "light" version of the Western swing sound that Bob Wills and others made famous, emphasizing the dance beat and meticulous arrangements.

From 1947 to 1964, he recorded for Capitol Records, then joined Warner Bros. Records, where he remained from 1966 through 1967. From 1968 through 1980, he recorded for Dot Records and its successors, ABC Dot and MCA Records. In 1997, Thompson released Hank Thompson and Friends, a collection of solo tracks and duets with some of country music's most popular performers. In 2000, he released a new album, Seven Decades, on the Hightone label. The title reflected his recording history from the 1940s to 2000s.

Thompson was elected to the Country Music Hall of Fame in 1989, and was inducted into the Nashville Songwriters Hall of Fame in 1997. He continued touring throughout the U.S. until shortly before he became ill. Often, he worked with a reconstituted version of the Brazos Valley Boys that included a few original members.

Retirement and death
Thompson's last public performance was on October 8, 2007, in Waco, Texas, his birthplace. A smoker for most of his adult life, Thompson was admitted into a Texas hospital in mid-October for shortness of breath. He was diagnosed with a particularly aggressive form of lung cancer. On  November 1, 2007, two days after being released, Thompson cancelled the rest of his 2007 "Sunset Tour" and retired from singing. He went into hospice care at his home in Keller, Texas, and died five days later, on November 6, 2007, aged 82.

According to Thompson's spokesman, Tracy Pitcox, president of Heart of Texas Records, Thompson requested that no funeral be held. On November 14, a "celebration of life", open to both fans and friends, took place at Billy Bob's Texas, a Ft. Worth country and western nightclub that bills itself as the World's Largest Honky-Tonk.

Discography

Albums

Singles

Music videos

See also
Academy of Country Music
List of country musicians
Country Music Association
List of best-selling music artists
Inductees of the Country Music Hall of Fame (1989 Inductee)

Notes

References
 Rumble, John. (1998). "Hank Thompson". In The Encyclopedia of Country Music 1st edition 1998. Paul Kingsbury, Editor. New York: Oxford University Press. pp. 536–7.

External links
Official Website
Thompson at the Country Music Hall of Fame and Museum
Obituary in The Times of London, 16 November 2007

1925 births
2007 deaths
American country singer-songwriters
American male singer-songwriters
Country Music Hall of Fame inductees
Western swing performers
United States Navy personnel of World War II
Singer-songwriters from Oklahoma
Deaths from lung cancer
People from Waco, Texas
American bandleaders
Deaths from cancer in Texas
20th-century American singers
Singer-songwriters from Texas
People from Keller, Texas
Country musicians from Texas
Country musicians from Oklahoma
20th-century American male singers
Waco High School alumni
United States Navy sailors